Petit Jean De Latre ( or 1510 – 31 August 1569) or Joannes de Latre (his surname is also recorded as Delattre, Delatre, De Lattre and Laetrius) was a Flemish  Renaissance composer and choirmaster who worked in Liège and Utrecht. He is no longer believed to be same person as Claude Petit Jehan who died in 1589.

Life
The earliest record of his employment is for 1538 to 1539 when he was maître de chant at church of St John the Evangelist in Liège. Subsequently De Latre was employed at St Martin, Liège. From about 1550 he was also chapel master to George of Austria, Prince-Bishop of Liège (1544–1557), to whom De Latre dedicated his first volume of secular songs or chansons of 1552.

During his time in Liège notable pupils included Gerard de Villers and Johannes Mangon.

After George of Austria's death in 1557 De Latre continued to work at St Martin, but in 1563 took up a post for a short period in Amersfoort (within the province of Utrecht). Around this time the former rector of the Latin school in Amersfoort, Johannes Oridryus, together with Albertus Buysius, undertook the publication of a collection De Latre's chansons, Cantionum musicarum, in Düsseldorf. De Latre returned to Liège as succentor at St Martin, but was dismissed for debt in 1564.

By 1565 De Latre was employed at the Janskerk in Utrecht where he is described as a Magister and Cantor. He may later have been employed at the Buurkerk there. He was buried at the Buurkerk in Utrecht in 1569, where his epitaph described him as a musici excellentissimi.

The best attested of his works are his published chansons and the set of Lamentations, which was published in 1554 in Maastricht by the Flemish printer Jacob Bathen.  The work entitled Lamentationes aliquot Jeremiae was dedicated to Anton of Schauenburg, at that time the dean of the Saint Servatius chapter in Maastricht, and later archbishop of Cologne. In addition a number of works survive in manuscript, but some may be by other composers.

Works
 Lamentationes aliquot Jeremiae for 3 voices (Jacob Bathen, Maastricht, 1554)
 Sacred motets, at least 16 of which have been identified (1547–1564)
 29 secular chansons in his first book, Chansons à quatre parties (Leuven, 1552)
 24 French and Flemish chansons or songs in Cantionum musicarum quae diversis vocibus (Düsseldorf, 1563)
 Further chansons including Livre septiesme (Leuven, 1564)

Recordings
 Renaissance am Rhein, Singer Pur, Oehms Classics, 2011 - includes the motet Qualis est dilecta mea and the chansons Comme la rose and Si seule estois.
 Maastrichts Liedboek / Maastricht songbook (Nieuwe Duytsche Liedkens - Jacob Bathen, 1554), Camerata Trajectina, Globe Records GLO 6046, recorded 1999 - includes the Flemish chanson Al hadden wij vijfenveertich bedden.

Notes

References
 José Quitin and Henri Vanhulst, "De Latre [Delatre, De Lattre, Laetrius, De Latere], Petit Jean [Jehan, Jan; Johannes Petit]" New Grove Music Dictionary of Music and Musicians.
 Henri Vanhulst, "La fricassé de Jean de Latre (1564)" in Revue belge de musicologie - Belgisch Tijdschrift voor Muziekwetenschap, Volume 47, 1993.
 Jan Willem Bonda, De meerstemmige Nederlandse liederen van de vijftiende en zestiende eeuw (The polyphonic songs in Dutch of the fifteenth and sixteenth centuries). Published by Verloren, Hilversum, 1996. .

1569 deaths
Belgian classical composers
Belgian male classical composers
Renaissance composers
Year of birth uncertain